Aleksander Fjeld Andersen (born 15 April 1997) is a Norwegian biathlete. He has competed in the Biathlon World Cup since 2021.
He is the older brother of fellow Norwegian biathlete Filip Fjeld Andersen.

References

External links

1997 births
Living people
Norwegian male biathletes
People from Nesodden
Sportspeople from Viken (county)